Frederick Arthur Barber (13 May 1887 – 4 June 1943) was an English cricketer who played first-class cricket for  Derbyshire between 1907 and 1920.

Barber was born at Ilkeston, Derbyshire. He made his first-class debut for Derbyshire in May 1907 against Marylebone Cricket Club (MCC) when he took a total of three wickets, but was out for a duck in both innings. He next played two matches in 1911, and then another two matches several years later in 1920. Barber took 9 first-class wickets at an average of 29.66 and a best performance of 2 for 19. He played ten innings in five first-class matches with an average of 3.33 and a top score of 10.

Barber died at The Pastures, Mickleover, Derbyshire at the age of 56.

References

1887 births
1943 deaths
Derbyshire cricketers
English cricketers
People from Mickleover
Cricketers from Derby